Ray Costict (March 19, 1955 – January 3, 2012) was a linebacker for the New England Patriots from 1977 to 1979. Costict played collegiately at Mississippi State before being drafted the 11th round by the Patriots.

He is Mississippi State's career leader in tackles with 467.

References

1955 births
2012 deaths
People from Moss Point, Mississippi
American football linebackers
Mississippi State Bulldogs football players
New England Patriots players
New Jersey Generals players
Players of American football from Mississippi